The discography of Lucinda Williams, an American singer, songwriter, and musician, consists of 14 studio albums, one live album, two video albums, and 25 singles, on Folkways Records, Smithsonian Folkways, Rough Trade Records, Chameleon, Mercury Records, Lost Highway Records, New West Records, Highway 20 Records, and Thirty Tigers.

Williams released her first albums, Ramblin' on My Mind (1979) and Happy Woman Blues (1980), on Folkways Records and Smithsonian Folkways. In 1988, she signed with Rough Trade Records and released her self-titled third album, Lucinda Williams, to critical raves. Her fourth album, Sweet Old World, appeared four years later on Chameleon Records, to further critical acclaim. In 1998, Car Wheels on a Gravel Road was released by Mercury Records, to critical and commercial success. The album was certified Gold by the RIAA the following year, and remains her best selling album to date. 

After signing with Lost Highway records, Williams released the albums Essence (2001), World Without Tears (2003), West (2007), Little Honey (2008), and Blessed (2011), all to further critical and commercial success. Additionally, the live album Live @ The Fillmore was released in 2005. The double albums Down Where the Spirit Meets the Bone (2014) and The Ghosts of Highway 20 (2016) appeared on Williams' own Highway 20 Records label. In 2017, This Sweet Old World was released on Highway 20 Records in conjunction with Nashville, Tennessee based distribution company Thirty Tigers, followed by the critically acclaimed Good Souls Better Angels in 2020. Later that year, Williams began "Lu's Jukebox", a six-episode series of themed live performances. A collaborative album with Charles Lloyd and the Marvels, titled Vanished Gardens, appeared in 2018.

Albums

Studio albums

Notes
  Did not chart when first released in 1988.  When reissued in 2014 it reached No. 39.
  Reached No. 25 on the Billboard Top Heatseekers chart.
  Reached No. 14 on the Canadian RPM Country Albums chart.

Live albums

Lu's Jukebox

Other albums

Singles

Video albums

Guest and compilation appearances
 Credits adapted from AllMusic.
1988 – Various Artists – "Dark Side of Life" on A Town South of Bakersfield, Vols. 1 & 2
1990 – Various Artists – "Which Will" (first version) on True Voices
1990 – The Band of Blacky Ranchette – "Burning Desire" on Sage Advice
1992 – David Rodriguez – "Deportee (Plane Wreck at Los Gatos)" on The True Cross
1993 – Various Artists – "Pancakes" on Born to Choose
1993 – Various Artists – "Main Road" on Sweet Relief: A Benefit for Victoria Williams
1993 – Jimmie Dale Gilmore – "Reunion" on Spinning Around the Sun
1993 – Michael Fracasso – "Door No. 1" on Love & Trust
1994 – Various Artists – "You Don't Have Very Far to Go" on Tulare Dust: A Songwriter's Tribute to Merle Haggard
1994 – Various Artists – "Positively 4th Street" on In Their Own Words, Vol. 1 – Live Performances from the Bottom Line, New York City
1994 – Julian Dawson – "How Can I Sleep Without You" on How Human Hearts Behave
1994 – Lisa Mednick – "A Different Sky" on Artifacts of Love
1995 – Terry Allen – "Room to Room" and "Black to Black" on Human Remains
1995 – Kieran Kane – "This Dirty Little Town" on Dead Rekoning
1995 – Chris Gaffney – "Cowboys to Girls" on Loser's Paradise
1996 – Various Artists – "The Night's Too Long" on Lone Star: Original Soundtrack from the Film
1996 – Steve Earle – "You're Still Standing There" on I Feel Alright
1997 – RB Morris – "Glory Dreams" on Take That Ride
1997 – Ray Wylie Hubbard – "The Ballad of the Crimson Kings" on Dangerous Spirits
1997 – Donnie Fritts – "Breakfast in Bed" on Everybody's Got a Song
1997 – Bo Ramsey – "Desert Flower" on In the Weeds
1998 – Hayseed – "Precious Memories" and "Credo" on Melic
1998 – Robbie Fulks – "Pretty Little Poison" on Let's Kill Saturday Night
1998 – Various Artists – "Here in California" on Treasures Left Behind: Remembering Kate Wolf
1998 – Nanci Griffith – "Wings of a Dove" on Other Voices, Too (A Trip Back to Bountiful)
1998 – Various Artists – "Come to Me Baby" on Wolf Tracks: A Tribute to Howlin' Wolf
1999 – Bonepony – "Sweet Bye and Bye" on Traveler's Companion
1999 – Bruce Cockburn – "When You Give It Away", "Isn't That What Friends Are For?", "Look How Far" and "Use Me While You Can" on Breakfast in New Orleans, Dinner in Timbuktu
1999 – Julian Dawson – "How Can I Sleep Without You" on Spark
1999 – Leftover Salmon – "Lines Around Your Eyes" on The Nashville Sessions
1999 – Various Artists – "Return of the Grievous Angel" with David Crosby on Return of the Grievous Angel: Tribute to Gram Parsons
1999 – John Prine – "Wedding Bells"/"Let's Turn Back The Years" on In Spite of Ourselves
1999 – Little Milton – "Love Hurts" on Welcome to Little Milton
1999 – Evie Sands – "Cool Blues Story" on Women in Prison
1999 – Chip Taylor – "Through Their Mother's Eyes" and "If I Don't Know Love" on Seven Days in May...a love story
2000 – Sue Foley – "Empty Cup" on Love Comin' Down
2000 – Kevin Gordon – "Down to the Well" on Down to the Well
2000 – Chip Taylor – "Head First", "Annie on Your Mind" and "The Ghost of Phil Sinclair" on The London Sessions Bootleg
2001 – Kasey Chambers – "On a Bad Day" on Barricades & Brickwalls
2001 – Matthew Ryan – "Devastation" on Concussion
2001 – Various Artists – "Cold, Cold Heart" on Timeless: Hank Williams Tribute
2001 – Ralph Stanley and Friends – "Farther Along" on Clinch Mountain Sweethearts
2001 – Various Artists – "Nothin'" on A Tribute to Townes Van Zandt
2001 – Chip Taylor – "Could I Live with This" and "The Ship" on Black and Blue America
2001 – Various Artists – "Angels Laid Him Away" on Avalon Blues: A Tribute to the Music of Mississippi John Hurt
2002 – Various Artists – "Lately" on Going Driftless: An Artist's Tribute to Greg Brown
2003 – Various Artists – "Hang Down Your Head" on Crossing Jordan – Original Soundtrack
2003 – Terri Binion – "GayleAnne" on Fool
2003 – Various Artists – "Hard Times Killing Floor Blues" on Martin Scorsese Presents the Blues: The Soul of a Man
2003 – Colin Linden – "Don't Tell Me" on Big Mouth
2004 – Graham Parker – "Cruel Lips" on Your Country
2004 – Flogging Molly – "Factory Girls" on Within a Mile of Home
2004 – Elvis Costello – "There's a Story in Your Voice" on The Delivery Man
2004 – Willie Nelson – "Overtime" on It Always Will Be
2004 – Willie Nelson – "Overtime" (live) on Outlaws and Angels
2004 – Various Artists – "Pyramid of Tears" on Por Vida – A Tribute to the Songs of Alejandro Escovedo
2004 – Various Artists – "Down to the Well" with Kevin Gordon on No Depression: What It Sounds Like, Vol. 1
2004 – Tony Joe White – "Closing In on the Fire" on The Heroines
2005 – North Mississippi Allstars – "Hurry Up Sunrise" on Electric Blue Watermelon
2006 – Tim Easton – "Back to the Pain" on Ammunition
2006 – Ramblin' Jack Elliott – "Careless Darling" on I Stand Alone
2006 – P.F. Sloan – "Sins of a Family" on Sailover
2006 – John Brannen – "A Cut So Deep" on Twilight Tattoo
2006 – Anne McCue – "Hellfire Raiser" on Koala Motel
2006 – Various Artists – "Bonnie Portmore" on Rogue's Gallery: Pirate Ballads, Sea Songs, and Chanteys
2006 – Doug Pettibone – "Two of Us" and "She Belongs to Me" on The West Gate
2007 – Various Artists – "Honey Chile" on Goin' Home: A Tribute to Fats Domino
2007 – John Platania – "In Memory of Zapata" on Blues, Waltzes & Badland Borders
2008 – Various Artists – "Mamas Don't Let Your Babies Grow Up to Be Cowboys" on The Imus Ranch Record
2008 – Carrie Rodriguez – Mask of Moses on "She Ain't Me"
2009 – Susan Marshall – "Don't Let Me Down" on Little Red
2009 – Various Artists – "Positively 4th Street" (studio version) on The Village: A Celebration of the Music of Greenwich Village
2009 – M. Ward – "Oh Lonesome Me" on Hold Time
2010 – Various Artists – "Kiss Like Your Kiss" with Elvis Costello on True Blood – Music from the HBO Original Series Volume 2 [Soundtrack]
2010 – Various Artists – "The Ballad of Lucy Jordan" on Twistable, Turnable Man: A Musical Tribute to the Songs of Shel Silverstein
2010 – Ray Davies – "Long Way from Home" on See My Friends (album)
2010 – Jimmy Webb – "Galveston" on Just Across The River
2010 – Various Artists – "Somebody Somewhere (Don't Know What He's Missin' Tonight)" on Coal Miner's Daughter: A Tribute to Loretta Lynn
2011 – Over the Rhine – "Undamned" on The Long Surrender
2011 – Michael Monroe – "Gone, Baby Gone" on Sensory Overdrive
2011 – Amos Lee – "Clear Blue Eyes" on Mission Bell
2011 – Blackie & The Rodeo Kings – "If I Can't Have You" on Kings & Queens
2011 – Steve Cropper – "Dedicated to the One I Love" and "When I Get Like This" on Dedicated: A Salute to the 5 Royales
2011 – Son of the Velvet Rat – "Moment of Fame" and "White Patch of Canvas" on Red Chamber Music
2011 – Tom Russell – "A Hard Rain's A-Gonna Fall" on Mesabi
2011 – Various Artists – "I'm So Happy I Found You" on The Lost Notebooks of Hank Williams
2012 – Marvin Etzioni – "Lay It on the Table" on Marvin Country!
2012 – Lil' Band o' Gold – "I'm Ready" on Lil' Band o' Gold Plays Fats
2012 – Walter Rose – "Driving South" on Cast Your Stone
2012 – Various Artists – "Tryin' to Get to Heaven" on Chimes of Freedom: The Songs of Bob Dylan Honoring 50 Years of Amnesty International
2012 – Various Artists – "God I'm Missing You" on KIN: Songs by Mary Karr & Rodney Crowell
2012 – Various Artists – "Hurt" on We Walk the Line: A Celebration of the Music of Johnny Cash
2012 – Various Artists – "That Time Of Night" on Oh Michael, Look What You've Done: Friends Play Michael Chapman
2012 – Various Artists – "The Farm" on The Inner Flame: A Rainer Ptacek Tribute
2012 – Various Artists – "Mississippi You're On My Mind" on Quiet About It: A Tribute To Jesse Winchester
2012 – Various Artists – "Whispering Pines" on Love for Levon
2012 – Various Artists – "House of Earth" on Woody Guthrie at 100: Live at the Kennedy Center
2013 – Various Artists – "Everything But the Truth" (first version) on The Lone Ranger: Wanted
2013 – Various Artists – "This Old Guitar" on The Music Is You: A Tribute to John Denver
2013 – Various Artists – "Partners in Crime" on Songs for Slim: Rockin' Here Tonight—A Benefit Compilation for Slim Dunlap
2014 – Chip Taylor – "Sleep with Open Windows" and "I'll Only Be Me Once" on The Little Prayers Trilogy
2014 – Various Artists – "The Pretender" on Looking into You: A Tribute To Jackson Browne
2015 – Buick 6 – "So Much Trouble in the World" on Plays Well with Others
2015 – G. Love and Special Sauce – "New York City" on Love Saves the Day
2015 – Don Henley – "Train in the Distance" on Cass County
2015 – Boz Scaggs – "Whispering Pines" (duet version) on A Fool to Care
2015 – Various Artists – "Met an Old Friend" on Remembering Mountains: Unheard Songs by Karen Dalton
2016 – Buddy Miller – "Hickory Wind" (duet version) on Cayamo Sessions at Sea
2016 – Various Artists – "It's Nobody's Fault But Mine" and "God Don't Never Change" on God Don't Never Change: The Songs of Blind Willie Johnson
2016 – Various Artists – "Hickory Wind" on The Life & Songs of Emmylou Harris
2018 – Charles Lloyd – Vanished Gardens (with The Marvels)
2020 – Various Artists - "Life's a Gass" on Angelheaded Hipster: The Songs of Marc Bolan & T. Rex
2021 – Sharon Van Etten – "Save Yourself" on Epic Ten
2021 : Raise the Roof by Robert Plant and Alison Krauss - Back vocals

References

External links
Lucinda Williams' Official Website

Discography
Discographies of American artists
Country music discographies
Pop music discographies
Rock music discographies